Doom Eternal is a first-person shooter game developed by id Software and published by Bethesda Softworks. The sequel to Doom (2016), and the seventh game in the Doom series, it was released on March 20, 2020, for PlayStation 4, Stadia, Windows, and Xbox One, with a version for Nintendo Switch being released on December 8, 2020, and versions for PlayStation 5 and Xbox Series X and Series S being released on June 29, 2021. Set some time after the events of the 2016 game, the story follows the Doom Slayer once again, on a mission to end Hell's consumption of Earth and foil the alien Maykrs' plans to exterminate humanity.

Along with the single-player campaign, a multiplayer mode, Battlemode, was introduced. In this mode, players can either play as the Doom Slayer or as a demon, and fight until either the Doom Slayer defeats the demons, or vice versa. A horde mode was added in October 2021. The Ancient Gods, a two-part standalone campaign DLC set after the events of the main game, was released between October 2020 and March 2021.

Doom Eternal was released to a positive critical response, with praise for its campaign, graphics, level design, soundtrack, and combat mechanics, though some disliked the increased focus on storytelling and its platforming sections. Doom Eternal received five nominations at The Game Awards for 2020, including Game of the Year and Best Action Game.

Gameplay
Players once again take on the role of the Doom Slayer who battles the demonic forces of Hell, from a first-person perspective. The game continues its predecessor's emphasis on "push-forward" combat, encouraging the player to aggressively engage enemies in order to acquire health, ammo, and armor. The player has access to various firearms, such as the Combat Shotgun, Super Shotgun, Heavy Cannon, Rocket Launcher, Plasma Rifle, Chaingun, BFG 9000, Ballista, and the Unmaykr. Melee weapons such as a chainsaw, the "Crucible Blade" energy sword, the Sentinel Argent Hammer (Hellbreaker), and a retractable arm-blade called the "Doomblade" can also be used. The arm-blade provides the opportunity for a larger variety of quick and violent "glory kill" executions, which drop extra health. The Super Shotgun is now equipped with the "Meat Hook", a ranged accessory which grabs on to enemies and slingshots the player towards them, functioning as a grappling hook, useful both in combat scenarios and environmental navigation. The Doom Slayer's armor now includes a shoulder-mounted Equipment Launcher with the ability to lob grenades and ice bombs. In addition, there is the Flame Belch, a flamethrower that sets enemies on fire with it to drop armor pickups. Finally, killing enemies with the chainsaw will drop ammunition. New movement mechanics such as wall-climbing, dash moves, and horizontal bars to swing from have also been introduced.

Like its predecessor, Doom Eternal invites the player to develop simple tactics. As the game gets harder, the player needs to use the advantages of fight arenas, and their bonuses, in more strategic ways. They also need to decide which enemy has to be killed first and how to move on the battlefield.

Creative director Hugo Martin has stated there would be twice as many demon types as in the 2016 reboot. There are new types of enemies, such as the Marauder and Doom Hunter, while others, such as the Pain Elemental, Arachnotron, and Arch-vile, have been reintroduced from previous Doom entries. A new system called "Destructible Demons" is featured, in which enemies' bodies progressively deteriorate as they take damage. Through this system, certain parts of a demon's anatomy can be destroyed to eliminate their ability to use their stronger attacks. There is also a new lives system. During gameplay, players can collect 1-up items (which look like green helmets) scattered around the environment. When the Doom Slayer perishes in combat, he will respawn where he died if he has spare lives, instead of restarting at the nearest checkpoint.

The game features several asymmetric multiplayer modes, including Battlemode. This game type is a 2v1 PvP multi-round match where two player-controlled demons take on one fully loaded Slayer. There are five playable demons at launch, with more to be included in free updates post-launch. The current six available demons are the Marauder, Mancubus, Pain Elemental, Revenant, Arch-vile, and Dread Knight. In addition to regular attacks, each demon has a "summoning wheel," which contains a selection of four additional abilities. An additional mode, Horde mode, was released on October 26, 2021, as a part of update 6.66.

Also new to the game is the hub area, called "Fortress of Doom", which players can visit between missions, containing a number of rooms with upgrades and gear locked behind doors. Players can also unlock a bonus weapon, the Unmaykr, after clearing six challenging Slayer Gates.

Plot

Main campaign 
In 2163, fourteen years after the events on Mars, Earth has been overrun by demons, wiping out 60% of the planet's population, under the corrupt Union Aerospace Corporation (UAC). What remains of humanity has either fled Earth or joined the Armored Response Coalition (ARC) resistance movement. The Doom Slayer, having previously been betrayed by Dr. Samuel Hayden, returns with a satellite fortress controlled by the AI VEGA to quell the demonic invasion by killing the Hell Priests: Deags Nilox, Ranak, and Grav. The priests serve an angelic being known as the Khan Maykr who seeks to sacrifice mankind for her own race's survival. The Slayer teleports to Earth and kills Deag Nilox, but the Khan Maykr transports the two remaining priests to unknown locations.

The Slayer retrieves a celestial locator from the Sentinel world of Exultia then a power source in Hell from the exiled Sentinel the Betrayer, who also gives him a dagger that he asks Slayer to stab the heart of his son with, whose body was turned into the apocalyptic demon, the Icon of Sin. The Slayer finds and kills Deag Ranak at his citadel in the Arctic. In response, the Khan Maykr moves Deag Grav again and accelerates the invasion of Earth. With no leads on the last Hell Priest, VEGA suggests finding Dr. Hayden, who knows his location. At an ARC compound, the Slayer retrieves Hayden's damaged robot chassis and the demonic Crucible.

Upon uploading Hayden's mind into the fortress, he reveals Deag Grav is hiding on Sentinel Prime; the only way to get there is a portal located in the lost city of Hebeth in Mars' core. The Slayer travels to the Martian moon Phobos, where he uses the BFG 10000 to shoot a hole in the surface of Mars to reach Hebeth. After reaching Sentinel Prime, flashbacks reveal the Slayer to be Doomguy. Found badly wounded by Sentinels sometime after Doom 64, Doomguy was brought before the Deags and forced to fight in a gladiatorial arena. Impressed by Doomguy's ruthlessness in battle, the Deags inducted him into the Sentinels.

In the present, the Slayer finds and kills Deag Grav in the arena. The Khan Maykr reveals to the Slayer her plan to resurrect the Icon of Sin to consume mankind. The Slayer travels to the Sentinel homeworld of Argent D'Nur for his own Crucible. Further flashbacks reveal that during the battle of Argent D'Nur, a rogue Maykr called the Seraphim imbued Doomguy with superhuman abilities by putting him in the Divinity Machine, transforming him into the Doom Slayer. It is revealed that the Khan Maykr had made a pact with Hell to produce Argent energy, which is created through the mass sacrifice of human souls. In return for providing worlds for Hell to invade, the Maykrs receive a share of the Argent energy produced by Hell, which allows their own dimension, Urdak, to survive.

The Slayer enters Urdak through Hell's citadel Nekravol, and halts the Icon's awakening ceremony by using the Betrayer's dagger to destroy its heart. Free from Maykr control, the Icon of Sin awakens and teleports to Earth. With the dimensional barrier destroyed, the demons break their alliance with the Maykrs and invade Urdak. The Slayer kills the Khan Maykr before returning to Earth to confront the Icon of Sin, although VEGA is left behind to ensure the portal stays open and in doing so, learns that he is the mind of the Father, the creator of the Maykr race. The Slayer kills the Icon of Sin in battle, putting an end to Hell's invasion of Earth.

The Ancient Gods

Part One
Despite having defeated the Icon of Sin and halting Hell's invasion of Earth, the Doom Slayer's victory did not come without cost. The death of the Khan Maykr and Hell's conquest of Urdak have given the demons a chance to dominate all dimensions and reinitiate their invasion of Earth. To prevent this, the Slayer, along with Samuel Hayden and ARC scientists, set out to liberate the Seraphim. The Slayer travels to the UAC Atlantica Facility, where the Seraphim's containment pod is. He uploads Hayden's consciousness into the pod, and it is revealed that he and the Seraphim are one and the same.

The Seraphim, suffering from a transfiguration terminal illness, tasks the Slayer with retrieving the Father's Life Sphere from the Blood Swamps of Hell, located within the Ingmore's Sanctum, in order to combine it with VEGA and return the Father to physical form. The Slayer finds the sphere but chooses to destroy it rather than hand it to the Seraphim, and instead retrieves the Dark Lord's Life Sphere with the intent of resurrecting and then destroying him, which in turn will destroy all demons outside of Hell by extension.

The Slayer returns to Urdak, which has been corrupted by the demons' occupation, and reaches the Luminarium where anyone who has a Life Sphere may activate it. However, the Slayer is confronted by the Seraphim, consumed by the degenerative transfiguration, and defeats him before he is teleported away by the Father. Despite being warned that bringing the Dark Lord into physical form is irreversible, the Slayer proceeds to summon him.

Part Two
Having summoned the Dark Lord into existence, the Doom Slayer attempts to kill him but fails as blood cannot be shed in the Luminarium. The Dark Lord tells the Slayer he will be waiting for him in Hell's capital city of Immora. 

In order to reach Immora, the Father informs the Slayer that he must activate the Gate of Divum, the only portal capable of reaching the city. The Slayer goes to Argent D'nur for a Wraith Crystal to power the portal, located inside the World Spear, a massive crystalline alien ship that had landed on the planet long ago. On the way, the Slayer encounters the Betrayer, who has reassumed his original name, Valen, after the defeat of the Icon of Sin. The Slayer lights the Torch of Kings to rally the remaining uncorrupted Sentinel forces, then recovers the Wraith Crystal. 

The Slayer activates the Gate of Divum on Earth. Traveling to Immora, the Slayer is greeted by the city's formidable defenses consisting of a massive wall and an army of demons. He is assisted by an army of Sentinels led by Valen, as well as many of the remaining human forces, who also teleport in and assault the city. While Hell's main forces are occupied with them, the Slayer follows the Dark Lord. 

Teleported to an arena, the Dark Lord and the Slayer fight. The Dark Lord reveals that he was the true creator of the multiverse and that Jekkad (later known as Hell) was the first dimension. The Maykrs, including the Father, betrayed him and rewrote history to depict the Father as the first being, which, in turn, led to the enraged Dark Lord influencing Samur Maykr to turn Doomguy into the Doom Slayer, whose original purpose was to (unintentionally) contribute to the destruction of the Maykrs and the Father, fulfilling the Dark Lord's revenge. The Slayer kills the Dark Lord, and all demons outside of Hell are instantly destroyed with his death, stopping the invasion for good. Being also one of the Dark Lord's creations, the Slayer falls unconscious before being sealed inside a stone sarcophagus at the Ingmore's Sanctum by the Seraphs.

Development
Publisher Bethesda Softworks announced the game at E3 2018, with the first gameplay footage being unveiled at QuakeCon 2018. The game was set to be released for PlayStation 4, Nintendo Switch, Windows, and Xbox One. In 2019, it was announced that Doom Eternal would come to Google's Stadia streaming platform. The game was developed by id Software with the Nintendo Switch version being developed by Panic Button. Doom directors Hugo Martin and Marty Stratton both returned, with Martin as game director and Stratton as executive producer.

The game is the first to be developed with the id Tech 7 engine. According to Stratton, the team aimed at making a "Doom universe", featuring larger and more varied locales, including "Hell on Earth", for players to explore. Unlike its predecessor, id Software developed the game's multiplayer component in-house, as opposed to being outsourced to the previous game's multiplayer developer Certain Affinity, with the goal of making the experience more "social" and "connected" with the single-player campaign. The team decided to remove the SnapMap mode and reassign its resource to develop post-launch campaign downloadable content. While originally scheduled for a release on November 22, 2019, Doom Eternal release was later pushed back to March 20, 2020, with a Nintendo Switch port coming at a later date, which on November 30 was revealed to be December 8, 2020.

Aesthetically, the game aims at having a closer resemblance to the original Doom games, with the enemies' designs having been modified from those in the 2016 game to match the designs of the original games. Additionally, the developers included the option to have a centered weapon view, which was traditional in the first two Doom games and was added as a post-release update to Doom 2016. Games cited as influences on the gameplay include arcade-style action games such as Devil May Cry and Bayonetta as well as chess. According to Martin, one facet they improved on was based on the controversy that arose from a video posted by Polygon of gameplay from the 2016 game. In that video, the person behind the gameplay did not appear to grasp some of the basic mechanics of Doom or even FPS gameplay, which led to some in the player community ridiculing the site. Martin said their team studied that video and believed that the person controlling the game was struggling against the design of the game, and for Doom Eternal wanted to make sure it was playable by everyone and not just skilled players and took some of those design factors into account. On August 6, 2020, Bethesda Softworks announced that next-gen versions for PlayStation 5 and Xbox Series X were also in development, with owners of the existing PS4 and Xbox One versions of the game being able to upgrade to the next-gen versions of the game at no additional cost.

The game is dedicated to id programmer Stephen Ash, who died during development in 2019.

Music
Mick Gordon returned as the composer. In January 2019, he put out a call for "metal screamers" to participate in a recording session to contribute to the soundtrack. The "heavy metal choir" included James Rivera of Helstar, Tony Campos of Static-X, Sven de Caluwé of Aborted, James Dorton of Black Crown Initiate, and Nature Ganganbaigal of Tengger Cavalry. Ganganbaigal died between the recording and the game's release. Oktavist Eric Hollaway also added vocals.

Soundtrack dispute 
The soundtrack was released for download on April 19, 2020, for buyers of the collector's edition. In the hours following the soundtrack's release, fans noticed differences between the soundtrack album and the music in the game, such as the large amount of compression on the track "BFG Division 2020" compared to the 2016 version. Gordon confirmed on Twitter that he only mixed a small number of the tracks, such as "Meathook" and "Command and Control". Metadata seems to suggest that most of the soundtrack was mixed by Chad Mossholder, id's audio director. Given his experiences working on the game, Gordon stated that he doubted he would work with id again.

In May 2020, Marty Stratton released a statement on Reddit, saying that Gordon was given extensive time to mix the tracks. According to Stratton, when Gordon did not complete the mixing before the soundtrack release deadline, Stratton suggested collaborating with Mossholder, which Gordon agreed to. Gordon sent Mossholder about 12 finished tracks. Mossholder mixed and edited the remaining songs together from in-game assets, which were more heavily compressed to compensate for the other in-game audio. Stratton later wrote that id would use a different composer in the future.

In September 2020, composer Andrew Hulshult announced he would compose music for The Ancient Gods campaign expansion along with David Levy. Hulshult had previously composed music for Quake Champions, another id game and the 'Goroth' track for the base release of Doom Eternal. Hulshult became a fan favorite with his fan-made remaster of the original Doom soundtrack 'IDDQD'.

On November 9, 2022, Mick Gordon released a lengthy post on Medium in response to Marty Stratton's Reddit post. The post contains his own account of the history of the in-game score, the OST, and how he repeatedly attempted to engage id to resolve issues before and after the release of the OST. The post also contains a detailed rebuttal of nine specific claims from Stratton's post. He alleged that there was no contract for a soundtrack album until two days before the game release, and that Mossholder had been working on a soundtrack assembly for six months before Gordon was brought on board.

On November 16, 2022 Bethesda released a statement backing Marty Stratton, Chad Mossholder, and everyone on the id Software team. Their statement further claimed that they had evidence to rebut Gordon's claims and expressed concern that his statement incited harassment and violence towards the team.

Release
The March 20, 2020, release date for Doom Eternal came to coincide with that of Nintendo's Animal Crossing: New Horizons. Due to the demand expected for both games, and in light of the COVID-19 pandemic, GameStop decided to begin selling Doom Eternal one day earlier, on the 19th, to minimize crowding. The stark contrast in tone between both games, combined with them being released on the same day, prompted fans of both series to celebrate the coincidence by creating light-hearted crossover art featuring the Doomguy and Animal Crossings Isabelle as "best friends".

Downloadable content
Before the game's release, it was announced that two campaign add-ons were planned to be released during the first year after launch. Access to these expansions is included with the purchase of the game's Deluxe Edition.

On May 8, 2020, two screenshots were published in the game's Twitter account, teasing scenes from the upcoming first story DLC. On August 7, 2020, a teaser trailer for the first part of the campaign DLC was released. In the teaser, the name of the DLC, to be released in two parts, was revealed to be The Ancient Gods and a date was set for a full trailer for Part One to be released on August 27, 2020, during the first night of Gamescom. In said trailer, the release date for the first expansion was revealed as October 20, 2020.

The Ancient Gods: Part One continues the story shortly after the events of the main campaign. Although the Doom Slayer was able to save Earth from the demonic invasion, his victory did not come without cost. Hell's invasion of Urdak has caused an imbalance of power that requires the true ruler of the universe to set things right. The Doom Slayer is recruited to help retake Urdak from demon control. The Ancient Gods is a standalone expansion, not requiring the base game to play.

On March 7, 2021, it was announced that a teaser trailer for the Ancient Gods: Part Two DLC would be released on March 15. The teaser in turn announced a full trailer for release two days later on March 17, which announced the expansion's release on the March 18.

Reception

Doom Eternal received "generally favorable" reviews, according to review aggregator Metacritic. Critics praised the campaign, graphics, level design, combat, soundtrack, and improvements over its predecessor, while some disliked the increased focus on storytelling and lore, and the platforming sections.

Phil Hornshaw of GameSpot gave the game an 8 out of 10, praising the game's combat and platforming, but criticizing the game's story, calling it "overly serious and confusing". Andrew Reiner of Game Informer criticized the game's multiplayer, calling it "a huge step back for the entire series." He also criticized the puzzles, saying he felt they were out of place. He did, however, praise the game's combat, particularly the game's expanded arsenal, as well as the soundtrack, calling it "catchy". He gave the game a score of 9.25 out of 10.

On its initial release, the version of the game offered via the Bethesda Launcher appeared to have been intended to ship with the Denuvo digital rights management (DRM) protection software, but it was not set up properly, leaving the game DRM-free. However, this was patched soon afterwards. Also, on May 14, 2020, the game was patched on Windows to include Denuvo anti-cheat technology, which operates by installing a kernel-mode driver. Some were concerned this would open up their computers to security vulnerabilities, while others claimed performance losses caused by the patch. This led users to review bomb the game on Steam over the decision. On May 20, id went on record stating that they would remove Denuvo anti-cheat upon the game's next patch due the following week, and would re-evaluate how they would implement anti-cheating measures in the game. The following week, the anti-cheat software was confirmed to be removed from the game.

Accolades

Doom Eternal was nominated for "Most Wanted Game" at the 2018 Golden Joystick Awards. At Game Critics Awards 2019, the game won the awards for Best PC Game and Best Action Game. It was also nominated for Game of the Year along with four other awards at the 2020 Game Awards, including Best Action Game, Best Score and Music, and Best Audio Design.

Sales
The game had 100,000 concurrent users on Steam on launch day, more than double that of 2016's Doom. The game doubled the launch weekend revenue of 2016's Doom. In Europe, the game debuted at number 2 in the UK charts and number 2 in the Switzerland charts behind Animal Crossing: New Horizons, although Doom Eternals physical sales were 33% less than its predecessor – a likely side-effect of the social distancing procedures implemented in wake of the COVID-19 pandemic.

In North America, the game was the sixth-best-selling game of March 2020, though this does not include digital sales. SuperData estimated that, as of March 2020, the game had sold 3 million digital copies worldwide, beating 2016's Dooms 957,000 units of launch month sales. This made Eternal the fourth-highest-grossing console game of March 2020.

In Germany, the game sold 100,000 units as of May 2020. 

According to former id Software employee Dave Saunders, Doom Eternal has made over $450 million in profit in less than a year since its launch.

Notes

References

External links
 
 DOOM Eternal at MobyGames
 DOOM Eternal: The Ancient Gods - Part One at MobyGames
 DOOM Eternal: The Ancient Gods - Part Two at MobyGames

2020 video games
Bethesda Softworks games
Doom (franchise) games
First-person shooters
Id Software games
Id Tech games
Permadeath games
Multiplayer and single-player video games
Multiplayer online games
Nintendo Switch games
PlayStation 4 games
PlayStation 5 games
Science fantasy video games
Stadia games
Video game sequels
Apocalyptic video games
Video games about demons
Video games developed in the United States
Video games scored by Mick Gordon
Video games set in outer space
Video games about extraterrestrial life
Video games set on Mars
Video games set in hell
Fiction set in the 2160s
Video games set in the 22nd century
Fiction set on Phobos (moon)
Video games with downloadable content
Windows games
Xbox Cloud Gaming games
Xbox Series X and Series S games
Xbox One games
Video games about cults
Video games about Satanism
Video games set in New York City
Horror video games